A roadgeek (from road + geek) is an individual involved in "roadgeeking" or "road enthusiasm"—an interest in roads, and especially going on road trips, as a hobby. A person with such an interest is also referred to as a road enthusiast, road buff, roadfan or Roads Scholar, the latter being a play on the term Rhodes Scholar.

Interest
Roadgeeks view their interest as an appreciation of engineering and planning feats:

However roadgeeks are not necessarily interested in motor vehicles; there may also be an interest in cartography and map design. Enthusiasts may focus on a single activity related to roads, such as driving the full length of a highway (known as 'clinching') or researching the history, planning and quirks of a particular road or national highway system. Sometimes, road geeks are called "highway historians" for the knowledge and interests.

Even the numbering system can be a subject of deep interest, as Joe Moran describes in his book "On Roads: A Hidden History":

Online
In 2002, the St. Louis Post-Dispatch reported that road enthusiasm was an Internet phenomenon. There is a Usenet newsgroup, misc.transport.road, where participants discuss all facets of roads and road trips from "construction projects to quirks and inconsistencies in signage". These individuals who anticipated each Rand McNally road atlas release each year found a community of others online who were also interested in roads as a hobby. These communities of people could share photos, swap their thoughts on the highways in their areas and "debate the finer points of interchange design".

Web based forums are popular; one of the largest is AARoads Forum.

SABRE
Started in 1999, the Society for All British and Irish Road Enthusiasts (SABRE), originally known as "Study and Appreciation of the British Roads Experience", is one of the larger and most prominent communities of road enthusiasts online. The organization hosts a large collection of articles and histories of particular roads and terminology, online photo galleries, discussion forums, and an application to overlay and compare historical roadmaps. Although SABRE is primarily an online group, members organize group tours to visit sites of interest.

Taiwan websites
In 2006, a board called "Road" in the PTT Bulletin Board System, which is a Taiwanese forum, was established. Because some Taiwanese road enthusiasts didn't know how to use a terminal or BBS reader to access it, the web forum Taiwan Highway Club (literally, "Highway State") was started in 2008; it contains subforums allowing users to discuss road policies, and to add news about, and post pictures of, highways. However, since the online community service by Pixnet was discontinued in 2012, the site moved to their own website.

Relationship with governments
In Taiwan, the Ministry of Transportation and Communications' Directorate General of Highways has held occasional Road Fan Conferences since 2011 to allow roadfans and highway transportation-related organizations to make suggestions to the government.

References

Further reading

External links
 AARoads Glossary
 

Hobbies
Transport culture
Greek